Taksim Spor Kulübü is a sports club located in Beyoğlu, Istanbul, Turkey. The football team of the club plays in the Istanbul Super Amateur League. The club was founded in 1940 by mostly members of the Armenian community of Istanbul when Ateş-Güneş, Nor Şişli and Kalespor clubs merged. The club has had  players of Armenian, Jewish and Greek descent as well as other Turkish players in its history.

Attendances
 Istanbul Amateur League: 1940–67
 Turkey Second League: 1967–68
 Turkey Third League: 1968–74
 Istanbul (Super) Amateur League: 2016–...

See also
Garo Hamamcıoğlu

References

External links
Official Website
Team info @TFF.org

Football clubs in Istanbul
Association football clubs established in 1940
Sport in Beyoğlu
1940 establishments in Turkey